Rasika is a 1994 Indian Kannada language romantic drama film written and directed by Dwarakish and produced by Rockline Venkatesh. The film stars V. Ravichandran along with Bhanupriya and Shruti among others. It is a remake of the Tamil movie Senthamizh Pattu directed by P. Vasu. The movie was dubbed in Tamil as Amma En Deivam and marked Bhanupriya's Kannada debut.

Plot 
Ravichandran lives in village with his mother as a milk vendor with many cows continues...

Cast 
 V. Ravichandran as Krishna 
 Bhanupriya as Rekha 
 Shruti as Rukmini, Lakkanna's Sister 
 Jayanthi as Yashodha, Krishna's Mother 
 Dwarakish as Lakkanna
 Puneet Issar as Rajagopal 
 Rockline Venkatesh as Rajeev
 Sunil Puranik

Soundtrack 
The music was composed and lyrics were written by Hamsalekha. All the seven tracks composed for the film became popular with "Ambaraveri" and "Haadondu Haadabeku" being received well.

References

External links 

 Movie full

1994 films
1990s Kannada-language films
Indian romantic drama films
Films scored by Hamsalekha
1994 romantic drama films
Films directed by Dwarakish